The Blenio Valley is a valley of the Lepontine Alps in the Swiss canton of Ticino. The valley contains the river Brenno. The upper valley, between Lai da Sontga Maria and Olivone, is named Valle Santa Maria.

Valleys of Ticino
Lepontine Alps